Huron Park Secondary School (HPSS) is a high school in Woodstock, Ontario. It opened in 1955, and has a population of approximately 800 students.

Notable alumni
 Ian Tanner – singer/songwriter
 Elizabeth Wettlaufer – serial killer and former registered nurse

References

High schools in Oxford County, Ontario
Educational institutions established in 1955
Woodstock, Ontario
1955 establishments in Ontario